The discography of American country music singer-songwriter Loretta Lynn includes 50 studio albums, 36 compilation albums, two live albums, seven video albums, two box sets and 27 additional album appearances. Briefly recording with the Zero label, she signed an official recording contract with Decca Records in 1961, remaining there for over 20 years The first under the label was her debut studio album Loretta Lynn Sings (1963). It peaked at number two on the Billboard Top Country Albums survey. Lynn would issue several albums a year with her growing success, including a duet album with Ernest Tubb (1965), a gospel album (1965), and a holiday album (1966). Her seventh studio album You Ain't Woman Enough (1966) was her first release to top the country albums chart and to chart within the Billboard 200. Other albums to reach number one during this period were Don't Come Home a Drinkin' (With Lovin' on Your Mind) (1967) and Fist City. Don't Come A'Drinkin would also become Lynn's first album to certify gold by the Recording Industry Association of America (RIAA).

Lynn's 1971 album Coal Miner's Daughter reached number four on the country albums chart, number eighty three on the Billboard 200 and certified gold in the United States. Her third album of gospel music God Bless America Again was issued in 1972 and reached number seven on the country chart. She topped the Top Country Albums list twice in 1973 with the studio albums Entertainer of the Year – Loretta and Love Is the Foundation. Her second greatest hits album appeared in 1974 and would certify gold in the United States. After topping the country albums chart again with Somebody Somewhere (1976), Lynn released a tribute album dedicated to her friend and mentor Patsy Cline, I Remember Patsy (1977).

Lynn entered the 1980s with the studio album Loretta (1980), which became her first release to chart on the Canadian RPM Country Albums survey. She recorded albums with less frequency as the decade progressed. Who Was That Stranger (1988) was Lynn's final studio album with the MCA (formerly Decca Records) label, reaching number sixty three on the Top Country Albums chart. In 1993, she collaborated with Dolly Parton and Tammy Wynette to record the studio album Honky Tonk Angels. Reaching number six on the country albums list and forty two of the Billboard 200, the album would also certify gold in the United States and Canada. Lynn then paused her music career due to her husband's failing health. Following his passing, she returned in 2000 with her first solo studio album in twelve years, Still Country. Lynn's next studio album was the critically acclaimed Van Lear Rose (2004). Produced by rock musician Jack White, the album reached number two on the Billboard Top Country Albums chart and number twenty four on the Billboard 200. Between 2006 and 2017, Lynn recorded dozens of songs with producer John Carter Cash. In 2016, she released her first studio album contained from these sessions titled Full Circle. This was followed in 2018 by Wouldn't It Be Great.

Studio albums

1960s

1970s

1980s

1990s–2020s

Compilation albums

1960s–1980s

1990s–2010s

Live albums

Box sets

Video albums

Other album appearances

References

External links 
 Loretta Lynn albums at Discogs

Country music discographies
Discographies of American artists
 Discography